Politics & Bullsh*t is the second studio album by Puerto Rican-American record producer Frankie Cutlass. It was released on February 11, 1997 via Relativity. It features guest appearances from Big Daddy Kane, Biz Markie, Busta Rhymes, Cocoa Brovaz, Craig G, Doo Wop, Evil Twins, Fat Joe, Heltah Skeltah, June Luva, J Quest, Keith Murray, Kool G Rap, Lost Boyz, M.O.P., Mobb Deep, Rampage, Redman, Roc-City-O, Roxanne Shanté, and Sadat X.

Track listing

Personnel

 Frank Malave – main artist, producer, mixing
 Raphael Gonzalez – featured artist (tracks: 2, 5, 11)
 Eric Murray – featured artist (tracks: 3, 8)
 Jamal Gerard Grinnage – featured artist (tracks: 3, 8)
 Joseph Antonio Cartagena – featured artist (tracks: 5, 11)
 Jahmal Bush – featured artist (track 2)
 Sean Price – featured artist (track 2)
 Terrance Kelly – featured artist (track 3)
 Raymond Rogers – featured artist (track 3)
 James Wilson – featured artist (track 4)
 Reginald Noble – featured artist (track 4)
 Derek Murphy – featured artist (track 4)
 Antonio Hardy – featured artist (track 7)
 Marcel Theo Hall – featured artist (track 7)
 Craig Curry – featured artist (track 7)
 Lolita Shanté Gooden – featured artist (track 7)
 Kejuan Muchita – featured artist (track 8)
 Albert Johnson – featured artist (track 8)
 Nathaniel Thomas Wilson – featured artist (track 8)
 Trevor George Smith Jr – featured artist (track 10)
 Tekomin B. Williams – featured artist (track 10)
 Darrell A. Yates, Jr. – featured artist (track 10)
 Keith Murray – featured artist (track 10)
 Ray Ramos – featured artist (track 11)
 True Da Grynch – featured artist (track 11)
 Roc-City-O – featured artist (track 9)
 J Quest – backing vocals (track 9)
 Joseph Anthony Hernandez – scratches (track 7)
 Leo "Swift" Morris – recording, mixing
 Joe Quinde – recording, mixing
 Tony Dawsey – mastering
 Daniel Hastings – photography

Charts

References

External links

1997 albums
Relativity Records albums